Sivanath Shastri or Sibanath Sastri (31 January 1848 – 30 September 1919) was a Bengali social reformer, writer, translator, scholar, editor philoshoper and historian.

References 

Sivanath Sastri (1847 – 1919)", thebrahmosamaj.net, retrieved 6 February 2022.

1847 births
1919 deaths
Bengali Hindus
20th-century Bengalis
19th-century Bengalis
Bengali historians
Writers from Kolkata
Sivanath Sastri
Presidency University, Kolkata alumni
Indian writers
Indian male writers
Indian non-fiction writers
Indian social workers
Indian translators
Indian scholars
Indian editors
Indian historians
Indian educators
Educationists from India
20th-century Indian writers
19th-century Indian writers
20th-century Indian male writers
19th-century Indian male writers
19th-century Indian educators
20th-century Indian educators
19th-century Indian non-fiction writers
20th-century Indian non-fiction writers
Indian novelists
19th-century Indian novelists
20th-century Indian novelists
19th-century Indian historians
20th-century Indian historians
19th-century Indian philosophers
20th-century Indian philosophers
20th-century Indian scholars
19th-century Indian scholars
20th-century Indian translators
19th-century Indian translators
Social workers from West Bengal
Writers from West Bengal